Kwassi Klutse (born July 29, 1945) is a Togolese politician who was the Prime Minister of Togo from August 20, 1996 to May 21, 1999.

Life and career
Klutse was born in Agbélouvé, Zio Prefecture.  After working as an official at the Ministry of Planning from 1977 to 1995, he was appointed to the government of Prime Minister Edem Kodjo as Minister of Planning and Territorial Development on November 29, 1995. Subsequently, in by-elections that were held in constituencies where the results of the 1994 parliamentary election had been annulled, the Rally of the Togolese People (RPT) of President Gnassingbé Eyadéma won all three constituencies at stake, giving it and its allies a parliamentary majority and enabling it to form a new government without relying on Kodjo's Togolese Union for Democracy (UTD) party. Klutse was then appointed as Prime Minister by Eyadéma on August 20, 1996.

Previously not a member of a political party, in 1997 Klutse joined the RPT and became a member of its Political Bureau. On August 19, 1998, Eyadéma accepted the resignation of Klutse and his government, but he reappointed Klutse on August 20 to head a new government, which was named on September 1. The opposition refused to participate in this government, and Klutse, speaking on television, "deplore[d] that the sincere and brotherly hand extended by the president was not accepted by the leaders of the opposition".

In the March 1999 parliamentary election, Klutse was elected to the National Assembly as the RPT candidate in the First Constituency of Zio Prefecture; he was unopposed and won the seat with 100% of the vote. He and his government resigned on April 17, 1999; Eyadéma accepted the resignation, and Klutse's government remained temporarily in office in a caretaker capacity. Eyadéma appointed Eugène Koffi Adoboli as Klutse's successor on May 21, 1999.

Klutse was re-elected to the National Assembly in the October 2002 parliamentary election from the First Constituency of Zio Prefecture.

In the October 2007 parliamentary election, Klutse was the second candidate on the RPT's candidate list in Zio Prefecture, but failed to win a seat; all three seats in Zio were won by the opposition Union of the Forces of Change (UFC).

Klutse remained a member of the Political Bureau of the RPT and was again chosen as a member of the RPT Central Committee from Zio Prefecture at the party's 9th Congress in December 2006.

References

Prime Ministers of Togo
1945 births
Living people
Members of the National Assembly (Togo)
Rally of the Togolese People politicians
21st-century Togolese people